Mount Marks is a broad ice-covered mountain rising to   north-northwest of Mount Speyer in the Worcester Range of Antarctica. It was named after Rodney Marks (1968–2000), an Australian citizen who died while conducting astrophysical research as a member of the 2000 winter party at the National Science Foundation South Pole Station. He was employed by the Smithsonian Astrophysical Observatory, working on the Antarctic Submillimeter Telescope and Remote Observatory, a research project of the University of Chicago's Center for Astrophysical Research in Antarctica (CARA). He had previously spent the 1998 winter at the Pole as part of CARA's South Pole Infrared Explorer project.

References

Mountains of the Ross Dependency
Hillary Coast